Richard Akinfolarin Taylor (born 2 October 2000) is an English professional footballer who plays as a defender for Scottish Premiership side St Mirren.

Career
Taylor began his career at Burnley. In October 2018, Taylor joined Colne on loan, joining fellow Burnley scholars Michael Fowler, Will Harris and Ethan Kershaw also on loan at the club. In May 2019, Taylor signed for EFL League One club Southend United, after impressing for the club on trial. On 13 November 2019, Taylor made his debut for the club in a 3–1 EFL Trophy win against AFC Wimbledon. On 26 February 2021, Taylor joined National League side Barnet on loan for a month. He was released by Southend in the summer of 2021 following their relegation from the English Football League to the National League. Having dropped out of the professional game, Taylor played for well-known Youtube Sunday League side, SE Dons, in one of their XI matches for charity. He then appeared in a league match vs Kenningwell, in which he impressed, and had many admirers. He had a short spell at National League South side Dulwich Hamlet before he signed for National League side Dagenham & Redbridge on a free transfer after training with the club for a number of weeks. On 29 January 2022, Taylor joined League of Ireland First Division side Waterford on a free transfer.

After a successful season with Waterford, Taylor signed a short-term deal with Scottish Premiership side St Mirren on 1 January 2023, keeping him there until the end of the season.

Personal life
Born in Hackney, Taylor is of Nigerian descent.

Career statistics

References

2000 births
Living people
Association football defenders
English footballers
English people of Nigerian descent
Black British sportsmen
Footballers from Hackney, London
Burnley F.C. players
Colne F.C. players
Southend United F.C. players
Barnet F.C. players
Dulwich Hamlet F.C. players
Dagenham & Redbridge F.C. players
Waterford F.C. players
English Football League players
National League (English football) players
Northern Premier League players

St Mirren F.C. players
Scottish Professional Football League players